The individual eventing event, part of the equestrian program at the 2000 Summer Olympics, was held from 20 to 22 September 2000 in the Sydney International Equestrian Centre.  Like all other equestrian events, the eventing competition was mixed gender, with both male and female athletes competing in the same division.

For the 1996 and 2000 Olympic competitions, the individual and team contests were separate events. A rider could compete in both competitions as long as it was on  different horses. An example of this is individual winner David O'Connor who won his gold medal riding Custom Made, while he earned his team bronze medal with the U.S riding Giltedge.

Medalists

Results
The total score for each horse and rider was the sum of the total penalty points earned in the various phases of competitions.  The pair with the lowest number of penalty points was victorious.

Dressage
For the dressage portion of the competition, horse and rider pairs performed series of movements that were evaluated by judges.  Judges gave marks of 0 to 10 for each movement, subtracting points for errors.  The score for each judge was represented the total marks gained. For every point less than a total of 240, 0.2 Penalty Points were assessed.

Cross country
In the cross country phase, each pair had to traverse 14.3 kilometers of road and track, 3.1 kilometers of steeplechase, and an obstacle course spread over a track of approximately 7.4 kilometers.  Pairs received .4 penalty points for every second beyond the optimal time, up to a limit.  Any pair that had not finished in that time was eliminated.

Penalty points were also assessed for disobedience faults at obstacles and for falls.  Disobedience faults incurred 20 penalty points, rider falls incurred 65, and horse falls eliminated the pair.  The total penalty points from cross country were added to those incurred in phase 1, dressage, for a two-round total.

Total after Dressage and Cross Country

Show jumping
In show jumping, pairs received 4 penalty points for each obstacle knocked down, 4 penalty points for the horse's first disobedience, and 8 penalty points for the rider's first fall.  They also received 1 penalty point for each second over the optimum time.

They could be eliminated for a second disobedience, the rider's second fall, the horse's first fall, or taking more than twice the optimum time to finish the course.

Final Total

Cross country
In the cross country phase, each pair had to traverse 14.3 kilometers of road and track, 3.1 kilometers of steeplechase, and an obstacle course spread over a track of approximately 7.4 kilometers.  Pairs received .4 penalty points for every second beyond the optimal time, up to a limit.  Any pair that had not finished in that time was eliminated.

Penalty points were also assessed for disobedience faults at obstacles and for falls.  Disobedience faults incurred 20 penalty points, rider falls incurred 65, and horse falls eliminated the pair.  The total penalty points from cross country were added to those incurred in phase 1, dressage, for a two-round total.

Total after Dressage and Cross Country

Show jumping
In show jumping, pairs received 4 penalty points for each obstacle knocked down, 4 penalty points for the horse's first disobedience, and 8 penalty points for the rider's first fall.  They also received 1 penalty point for each second over the optimum time.

They could be eliminated for a second disobedience, the rider's second fall, the horse's first fall, or taking more than twice the optimum time to finish the course.

Final Total

References

Sources
 Official Report of the 2000 Sydney Summer Olympics available at  https://web.archive.org/web/20060622162855/http://www.la84foundation.org/5va/reports_frmst.htm

Equestrian at the 2000 Summer Olympics